The Slingers are a group of fictional superheroes appearing in American comic books published by Marvel Comics. They starred in their own eponymous short-lived comic book.

Fictional team history
The Slingers were four teenage superheroes who had been inspired by Spider-Man. The group first appeared in Slingers #0, a free promotional comic book included in an issue of Wizard. Slingers #1 used a controversial sales gimmick: four versions of the first issue were produced, each telling a fourth of the first issue's story from the point of view of one of the four team members. The series failed to sustain sales, despite a small but loyal fan base, and the series was cancelled with issue #12.

The team's four members used costumes and codenames that had been used by Spider-Man during the "Identity Crisis" crossover. During "Identity Crisis", Spider-Man was wanted for murder with a five million-dollar reward posted for his capture. Instead of his normal costumed identity, he adopted four other costumes and created a different crime-fighting persona for each suit. After this crisis had ended, he discarded the four costumes, and they subsequently disappeared, reappearing in the possession of the Golden Age superhero called the Black Marvel. The Marvel gave the costumes to four youths, and trained them to become heroes.

Aside from brief cameos in New Warriors and Contest of Champions II—during which they were defeated by the New Warriors in a game of basketball, the teams reasoning that not every contest had to be a straight-out fight—the team made no appearances elsewhere, and in their own series only received a few brief appearances by their inspiration, Spider-Man. When it was revealed that the Black Marvel had received the costumes through a deal with the demon Mephisto, the Slingers broke from him, and then returned to free his soul from Mephisto. The Black Marvel died, free from Mephisto's grasp, and the team apparently disbanded. Ricochet made several guest appearances in the Marvel comic Runaways as a member of Excelsior, a group of former teenage heroes whose goals are to help fellow teenage superheroes adjust to mundane lives, and to dissuade other super-powered teenagers from becoming heroes. They were introduced in "True Believers," the first arc of Runaways Volume Two. Ricochet (while attending their usual group meeting) followed both Darkhawk and the third Spider-Woman on their mission to take down the MGH dealers that once used Mattie as a source for the drug.

After the breakup of the Slingers, Hornet was found dead by forces of S.H.I.E.L.D.  He had died confronting Wolverine, who had been brainwashed by the Hand, an evil ninja cult. Prodigy resurfaced fighting against Iron Man during the Civil War event. Eventually he joined with Captain America's underground movement, and later became a recruit for the Initiative program. Dusk has been seen as a captive of the Puppet Master. At the end of Avengers: The Initiative, Prodigy was released from Prison 42, in which he was detained for having resisted Osborn's regime, and began working as a motivational speaker while trying to reunite the Slingers.

After Hydra's takeover of America was thwarted, Hornet was seen active in Las Vegas, prompting Ricochet and Dusk to travel there to confront their apparently resurrected ally, even as the Hornet steals from a casino on the part of his employer Silas Thorne and is confronted by Scarlet Spider. After the initial confrontation, Ricochet learns that the new Hornet is not only working with Prodigy, but received his costume from the Black Marvel and is thus convinced to join the other Slingers in forcing the Scarlet Spider to turn himself over to the police for beating Silas Thorne so badly that he was sent to hospital (the various Slingers unconcerned about Thorne's reported role in the theft of food supplies from a planned charity drive). After they take Cassandra Mercury hostage, she is found thanks to Ben Reilly and Kaine Parker tracking her hidden mobile phone, where they discover that the Slingers are being led by the Black Marvel. However, Dusk realizes that the Black Marvel has no soul, and damage to the Hornet's gauntlets reveal his true identity as Cyber who was revived by the as-yet-unidentified entity that was posing as Black Marvel. Although the Black Marvel taunts them that they were poor heroes due to their lack of coordination as a team, the other three Slingers join forces with the two Spiders to defeat Cyber and the demon possessing the Black Marvel, the Slingers defeating Cyber while Reilly and Kaine exorcise the demon. With the battle concluded, the Slingers accept that Reilly regrets his earlier beating of Thorne, acknowledging the shades of grey.

Team members
The four members of the Slingers were:

 Dusk (Cassie St. Commons): The Goth daughter of a rich socialite couple from Connecticut, she died in Slingers #0, and mysteriously returned from the dead in Slingers #1. Dusk has many supernatural abilities. Her primary power is the ability to teleport herself, or others, anywhere she wishes. She can manipulate shadows to form objects or constructs of solid dark energy. She also has the ability to sense the whereabouts of her teammates, and knows if they are in danger. She was aware of Hornet's feelings towards her, but found herself attracted to Johnny Gallo, who was dating someone else during the course of Slingers. She was seen (in costume) as a hypnotized prisoner being held by the Puppet Master in Ms. Marvel, Vol. 2, #18. Dusk made no further appearances during the storyline, which concluded with the Puppet Master's defeat and the release of his other captives. She reappeared in Las Vegas to assist Ricochet and the Scarlet Spider in a confrontation with a demonic creature summoned by the new Hornet.
 Hornet (Eddie McDonough): A freshman at Empire State University who was born with cerebral palsy, he wore a suit of flight-capable powered armor which enabled him to fly at high speeds. Micro-servos in the armored suit enhanced his strength beyond normal levels and allowed him to use his withered right arm. His gauntlets contained wrist blasters that could fire darts filled with a fast-acting sedative, which he called "Stingers," as well as powerful laser beams. After the group dissolved, he and Ricochet eventually returned to fighting crime together under the same identities until Hornet was killed battling a brainwashed Wolverine. His costume has since been used by an individual who initially identified himself only as 'Silas', until his true identity was revealed to be Wolverine's old foe Cyber.
 Prodigy (Ritchie Gilmore): The leader of the group; a wrestler who attended Empire State University. He is an athletic, stubborn loner. Prodigy's costume is mystically infused with power, giving him incredible superhuman strength, enough to stop a speeding train with his bare hands. He can leap incredible distances, appearing to fly. His golden costume is completely bulletproof, and can withstand most physical assaults. His cape has similar properties; it alone once protected a child from a burning building collapsing around him. Prodigy gave up his cape and powers at the conclusion of the Slingers series. However, he later resurfaced, apparently re-empowered. It has not been explained how he regained his abilities and his cape. He was arrested in Civil War: Frontline #2 by Iron Man, for openly defying the Super Hero Registration Act. Prodigy succeeded in sending a message to the people of the Marvel Universe, and his actions were considered the first act of Civil War. He was freed by Captain America's team during the prison break, and joined them in opposing Iron Man and his team of registered heroes. After Captain America's team's defeat, Prodigy was back to serving his jail time, but was offered a chance to serve in the Initiative Program. He eventually joined, begrudgingly, in the third group of recruits. Ritchie is not to be confused with David Alleyne of the New Mutants, who also used the codename Prodigy.
 Ricochet (Johnny Gallo): A mutant with superhuman agility, enabling him to leap great distances. He has incredible reflexes, which, combined with his leaping powers, enable him to seemingly bounce off walls (ricochet, as it were). His mutant powers also give him a "Danger Sense," which functions much like Spider-Man's "Spider-Sense." His jacket sleeves hold up to eight throwing discs. Ricochet originally used discs that he rebounded off walls, much as he himself did. Hornet later provided Ricochet with  special "gimmick" discs, which can return to the thrower after a short time, or even self-destruct. Johnny's mother was murdered when Johnny was in his early teens. Much later, he discovered that her killer was Orphan-Maker. Johnny had a troubled relationship with his cold and uncaring father. Ricochet and Hornet returned to fighting crime at one point after the Slingers dissolved, but Hornet's death prompted Johnny to seek help to give up the costumed life. He joined the Los Angeles-based "teenage superhero recovery group" Excelsior, where, despite the group's mission statement, he has repeatedly found himself fighting alongside other members of the group against local threats. He returned to action once again to investigate the apparent resurrection of the Hornet in Las Vegas.

References

External links
 Still on the Shelf #84 - Slingers. A brief review of the series, with issue synopses and short bios of the characters.
 Slingers cover gallery
 SpiderFan.org Slingers page
 Slingers on the Marvel Universe Character Bio Wiki

Marvel Comics titles
Marvel Comics superhero teams
1998 comics debuts
American comics characters
Comics characters introduced in 1998
Superhero comics
Spider-Man characters
Teenage superheroes